One Day Isang Araw is a 2013 Philippine television drama fantasy anthology broadcast by GMA Network. Created and developed by Senedy Que, it stars Jillian Ward, Milkcah Wynne Nacion, Joshua Uy and Marc Justine Alvarez. It premiered on June 15, 2013 on the network's Sabado Star Power sa Gabi line up. The show concluded on November 16, 2013 with a total of 23 episodes.

The series is streaming online on YouTube.

Premise
Daisy, Uno, Isang and Sunny are friends brought together by a common passion for curiosity. A tree house is their favorite hangout where they meet up every week for their storytelling sessions. They share stories of heartfelt situations and endearing characters they get to interact with.

Cast and characters

Lead cast
 Jillian Ward as Daisy
A former city girl who moved into the province to be with her grandmother. She is an intelligent eight-year-old girl who is also a fashion enthusiast and trendy. Daisy loves the idea of storytelling and wants to become a princess.
 Joshua Uy as Juan or Uno
A seven-year-old boy who loves creating /designing toys using recycled materials. He gets along well with Daisy, but at times they clash due to his "hostile" nature.
 Milkcah Wynne Nacion as Isang
Comes from a lower-class family. She is an eight-year-old girl who is fond of watching TV, particularly teledramas, wherein she finds inspiration while clinging to her belief that these programs mirror her own life.
Marc Justine Alvarez as Sunny
An eight-year-old boy who comes from a well-off family. Sunny loves toys and gadgets. He practically owns the "tree house" which eventually becomes the favorite hangout place of the group for their storytelling sessions.

Recurring cast
 Camille Prats as Arlene, Daisy's mother.
 Gloria Romero as Gracia, Daisy's grandmother.
 Bobby Andrews as Jun, Sunny's father.
 Miggy Jimenez and Nomer Limatog as Isang's older brothers.

Notable episodes

Ratings
According to AGB Nielsen Philippines' Mega Manila household television ratings, the pilot episode of One Day Isang Araw earned a 13.1% rating. While the final episode scored a 17.4% rating.

Accolades

References

External links
 
 

2013 Philippine television series debuts
2013 Philippine television series endings
Filipino-language television shows
GMA Network original programming
Philippine anthology television series
Television shows set in the Philippines